Begovača  is a village in Croatia.

References

Populated places in Bjelovar-Bilogora County